If on a Winter's Night... is the ninth studio album from British musician Sting. The album is a collection of Christmas and winter-themed songs mostly written by others, including folk songs, madrigals and religious hymns from past centuries. Dozens of musicians appear on the album in various configurations, including jazz, folk and classical players.

It was released in most countries on 26 October 2009, on 27 October 2009 in the United States and 2 November 2009 in the United Kingdom. The album was released in several formats: vinyl LP, a single-disc CD, a limited edition CD and making-of DVD entitled The Genesis of 'If on a Winter's Night...' in Six Chapters in hardback book packaging, an Amazon.com exclusive version, as well as various import editions (of note is the Japanese edition). The limited edition and Amazon exclusive both include bonus songs; the Japanese edition include them as well but adds "The Coventry Carol." The album includes a reworking of "The Hounds of Winter" from his album Mercury Falling.

The title of the album is based on the novel If on a winter's night a traveler by Italo Calvino.

Track listing

Personnel

Musicians 
 Sting – vocals, arrangements, lute (3), guitars (5, 8, 10, 11, 12, 14), snare drum (5), percussion (2, 8, 10, 17)
 David Hartley – harmonium (3)
 Julian Sutton – melodeon (6, 8, 10, 13, 14)
 David Sancious – organ (10)
 Dominic Miller – guitars (1, 4, 5, 7, 10, 13, 17)
 Dean Parks – guitars (2), mandolin (2)
 David Mansfield – mandolin (2, 8), 12-string guitar (5), lap dulcimer (5, 8), mandocello (8)
 Edin Karamazov – lute (15)
 Ira Coleman – bass (1, 2, 4, 5, 8, 9, 13, 15)
 Kenny Garrett – soprano saxophone (8)
 Chris Dudley – trombone (2)
 Ibrahim Maalouf – trumpet (1)
 Chris Gekker – trumpet (2)
 Brent Madsen – trumpet (2)
 Chris Botti – trumpet (11, 17)
 Leslie Neish – tuba (2)
 Marcus Rojas – tuba (2)
 John Clark – French horn (2)
 Bassam Saba – ney (3), oud (3)
 John Ellis – bass clarinet (7, 10)
 Daphna Mor – recorder (7)
 Mary Macmaster – harp (5, 8, 13, 17), vocals (5)
 Dov Scheindlin – viola (9)
 Kathryn Tickell – violin (2, 5, 6, 8, 10, 13), Northumbrian smallpipes (6)
 Peter Tickell – violin (2)
 Svetlana Tsovena – violin (7)
 Daniel Hope – violin (9, 14, 17)
 Vincent Ségal – cello (6, 7, 8, 10, 11, 13, 17)
 Melissa Meell – cello (9)
 Charles Curtis – cello (11)
 Robert Sadin – arrangements, string conductor (6, 11, 15, 16), percussion (7), soundscape (9)
 Allen Bluestein – string contractor (6, 11, 15, 16)
 Strings of the Musica Aeterna Orchestra – strings (6, 11, 15, 16)
 Joe Sumner – backing vocals (2, 3)
 The Webb Sisters – backing vocals (2, 3)
 Stile Antico – vocal ensemble (6)
 Lisa Fischer – backing vocals (8, 11), vocals (10)
 Jasmine Thomas – backing vocals (11)
 Jack DeJohnette – drums (8)
 Daniel Druckman – snare drum (8, 11)
 Cyro Baptista – percussion (1, 8, 10, 13, 17)
 Bijan Chemirani – percussion (3, 10)
 Daniel Freedman – percussion (3)
 Rhani Krija – percussion (3)
 Donald Hay – percussion (5)
 Bashiri Johnson – percussion (5, 10), frame drum (11)

Production 
 Sting – producer, mixing
 Robert Sadin – producer, mixing (1, 3-17)
 David Darlington – engineer, mixing (1, 3-17)
 Clark Germain – engineer
 Donal Hodgson – engineer, mixing (2)
 Tim Mitchell – additional engineer, assistant engineer 
 Todd Whitelock – additional engineer
 Mark Crowley – assistant engineer 
 Joshua Cutsinger – assistant engineer 
 Martin Hollis – assistant engineer 
 Royce Jeffres – assistant engineer 
 Adam Miller – assistant engineer 
 Mark Wilder – mastering (1, 3-15)
 Maria Triana – mastering assistant (1, 3-15)
 Bob Ludwig – mastering (2)
 Dave Sandford – production coordinator 
 Dana Wise – production coordinator 
 Joseph Hutchinson – package design, artwork 
 Tony Molina – cover photography

Studios
 Recorded at Steerpike Studio (Wiltshire, England); Villa Il Palagio (Florence, Italy); The Source (Malibu, Florida); Clinton Recording Studio, Manhattan Center Studios and Seven Seas Studio (New York City, New York).
 Mixed at Steerpike Studio; Villa Il Palagio; Clinton Recording Studio, Burning Kite Digital and Bass Hit Studios (New York City, New York).
 Tracks 1 and 3–17 mastered at Battery Studios (New York City, New York); Track 2 mastered at Gateway Mastering (Portland, Maine).

Charts

Weekly charts

Year-end charts

Certifications

See also
 List of Billboard Top Holiday Albums number ones of the 2000s

References

Sting (musician) albums
2009 Christmas albums
Classical albums by English artists
Pop Christmas albums
Folk Christmas albums